Ryūhei, Ryuhei or Ryuuhei (written: 龍平, 隆平 or 竜平) is a masculine Japanese given name. Notable people with the name include:

, Japanese politician and activist
, Japanese film director
, Japanese singer
, Japanese actor
, Japanese footballer
, Japanese footballer
, Japanese manga artist
, Japanese comedian

Japanese masculine given names